Japon İşi is a 1987 Turkish science fiction-comedy film, directed by Kartal Tibet and written by Erdoğan Tünaş, starring Kemal Sunal.

Plot
Veysel (Kemal Sunal) loves a singer named Başak (Fatma Girik). Başak, however, doesn't love him back.  One day Veysel saves the life of a Japanese tourist, in which this tourist sends to Veysel a gift from Japan. The gift is a robot, and looks identical to Veysel's crush Başak.

Selected cast 
 Kemal Sunal as Veysel
 Fatma Girik as Başak & Japanese Robot
 Sümer Tilmaç as Dilaver

External links
 

1987 films
1980s science fiction comedy films
1987 romantic comedy films
Robot films
Films set in Istanbul
1980s Turkish-language films
Turkish science fiction comedy films
Turkish romantic comedy films